This list of Bronze Age sites in China includes sites dated to either the Chinese Bronze Age, or Shang and Western Zhou according to the dynastic system. It is currently based on China's Major Historical and Cultural Site Protected at the National Level record.

Anhui

Fujian

Gansu

Guangdong

Guizhou

Hainan

Hebei

Henan

Heilongjiang

Hubei

Hunan

Jiangsu

Jiangxi

Jilin

Liaoning

Qinghai

Sichuan

Shaanxi

Shandong

Shanxi

Yunnan

Zhejiang

Guangxi

Inner Mongolia

Ningxia

Tibet

Xinjiang

Beijing

Chongqing

Shanghai

Tianjin

Hong Kong

Macau

See also
History of China
History of Manchuria
List of inventions and discoveries of Neolithic China
List of Neolithic cultures of China
List of Palaeolithic sites in China
Prehistoric Asia
Prehistoric China

References 

Archaeological sites in China

China
Bronze Age sites